Thiratoscirtus gambari is a species of jumping spider in the genus Thiratoscirtus that lives in Nigeria. It was first described in 2011.

References

Endemic fauna of Nigeria
Salticidae
Fauna of Nigeria
Spiders of Africa
Spiders described in 2011